The NJPW 49th Anniversary Show was a professional wrestling event promoted by New Japan Pro-Wrestling (NJPW). The event took place on March 4, 2021 in Tokyo, Japan at the Nippon Budokan arena. The event featured six matches, including the start of the annual New Japan Cup. In the main event match, Kota Ibushi defeated the IWGP Junior Heavyweight Champion El Desperado to retain his IWGP Heavyweight and IWGP Intercontinental Championships and become the first IWGP World Heavyweight Champion.

Production

Background 
NJPW was founded by Antonio Inoki on January 13, 1972 after his departure from the Japan Pro Wrestling Alliance promotion. The first NJPW event, titled Opening Series, took place on March 6, 1972, in the Ota Ward Gymnasium in Tokyo, to a crowd of 5,000. The NJPW Anniversary Show has since been held annually in the first week of March to celebrate the anniversary of the company, starting with the 40th Anniversary Show in 2012.

Since 2020, NJPW has been unable to run events with a full arena capacity due to COVID-19 restrictions. The 49th Anniversary Show continued this policy.

Storylines 
The NJPW 49th Anniversary Show featured professional wrestling matches that involve different wrestlers from pre-existing scripted feuds and storylines. Wrestlers portray villains, heroes, or less distinguishable characters in the scripted events that build tension and culminate in a wrestling match or series of matches.

After Kota Ibushi defeated Tetsuya Naito at Castle Attack, he was confronted by the IWGP Junior Heavyweight Champion El Desperado. A match between the two wrestlers was later signed for the Anniversary Show. While the Anniversary Show traditionally features a non-title match between the IWGP Heavyweight Champion and the current IWGP Junior Heavyweight Champion, it was announced that Kota Ibushi vs. El Desperado will be a title match for Ibushi's IWGP Heavyweight and IWGP Intercontinental Championships while also crowning the first IWGP World Heavyweight Champion.

Results

See also 

 2021 in professional wrestling
 List of major NJPW events

References

External links 

 Official New Japan Pro-Wrestling's website

2021 in professional wrestling
2021 in Tokyo
New Japan Pro-Wrestling shows
Professional wrestling in Tokyo
Professional wrestling anniversary shows